The Maliguda Tunnel of Odisha is the 4th Biggest broad-gauge railway tunnel in India after "Banihal – Quazigund Tunnel" which is in the state of Jammu & Kashmir. 

The tunnel is 13 km east of Jeypore, India, 27 km from Koraput.  The tunnel on which the entire route of 430 km was built by Japan  Engineers in between (1961–66) with Japanese collaboration for the supply of Iron Ore from Kirandul to Vizag Port via- Dantewara, Jagdalpur, Jeypore, Koraput, Padua, Araku, Kottavalasa.

References

Railway tunnels in India
Rail transport in Odisha
Buildings and structures in Odisha
1966 establishments in Orissa
Tunnels completed in 1966